Paul Elbert Hamm (born September 24, 1982 in Washburn, Wisconsin) is a retired American artistic gymnast. He is the 2004 Olympic all-around champion, a three-time Olympic medalist, and the 2003 World all-around champion. Hamm is the most successful American male gymnast in history, one of only two American gymnasts (along with Simone Biles) to win the all-around title at both the Olympics and the World Championships, and the only male American gymnast to do so.

Personal life
Hamm is the son of Sandy and Cecily Hamm. His twin brother, Morgan Hamm, is also a gymnast and Olympic medalist. His older sister, Elizabeth (Betsy), is a former member of the USA Gymnastics Senior National Team.

Career
Hamm is a three-time, consecutive U.S. National all-around champion, winning the titles from 2002–2004. In 2003, he became the first American man to win the all-around title at a World Championships. At the 2000 Summer Olympics in Sydney, Hamm competed alongside his twin brother Morgan Hamm and finished 5th in the team competition and 14th in the individual all-around competition.

2004 Summer Olympics
Hamm competed at the 2004 Summer Olympics in Athens once again with his twin brother Morgan Hamm. He won the silver medal in the team competition and won the gold medal in the all-around. He also nearly won the gold medal on high bar but was awarded the silver medal after a tiebreaker.

In the all-around competition, Hamm was in good position after the first three rotations, but a disastrous fall on the vault, in which he nearly fell into the judges' bench, dropped him to 12th place and he looked to be completely out of the running for a medal of any sort. Indeed, had a judge and the bench not been able to break Hamm's fall, he might have fallen from the podium and sustained injury. However, numerous faults by the other gymnasts, combined with Hamm's performance on the parallel bars, returned him to fourth place after the fifth rotation. His high bar routine in the final rotation earned a score of 9.837, winning him the gold medal by a margin of .012, the closest in Olympic gymnastics history. His scores on the six disciplines were:

 Floor: 9.725 (1st)
 Pommel Horse: 9.700 (4th)
 Rings: 9.587 (8th)
 Vault: 9.137 (12th)
 Parallel Bars: 9.837 (1st)
 Horizontal bar: 9.837 (1st)
 Overall: 57.823 (1st)

Gold medal controversy
Almost immediately after the competition, Hamm's gold medal in the all-around was called into doubt due to a scoring issue.

The International Gymnastics Federation (FIG) ruled that South Korean bronze medalist Yang Tae Young was incorrectly given a start value of 9.9 instead of 10.0 in the parallel bars event during the all-around final. The 0.100 point omitted from Yang's start value in parallel bars, determined by the difficulty of the routine, was because the judges believed Yang had performed a move called a "morisue" instead of a "belle" during his routine.  The difference in difficulty between those two moves—the 0.100 point—was the difference between third and first, and, therefore, between the bronze medal and the gold medal. The FIG suspended three judges but said the results would not be changed. The long-standing "Rules of Play" doctrine has prohibited sports officials from later changing the decisions of officials during the competition.

Adding to the news headlines, when the FIG ruled Young's start value was incorrect, the entire crowd began booing the judges, and the booing lasted for about ten minutes.

The USOC also argued that changing scores after the fact was a violation of the rules of the competition (under which gymnastic scores must be disputed immediately—before the gymnasts move to the next piece of equipment, and certainly before the medals are awarded) and that second-guessing scores set a harmful precedent in that the judges at the event had to make the decisions and nothing would ever be finalized if second guessing and video review of entire competitions after they ended were permitted.  Hamm supporters also pointed out that Yang's routine included 4 'hangs' instead of the 3 allowed, an error that, if caught, would have resulted in a penalty of .2 points, removing Yang from medal contention.

Hamm supporters contended that it would be like changing a two-point basket before the first half of a basketball game into a three-point shot based on a video review after the game that showed the shooter was behind the three-point line, thereby deciding that the shooter's team would be awarded the win because the game was tied at the end of regulation.  If the extra point had been awarded when it was scored, the opponent would have changed its end-game strategy to account for the opponent's additional score.

Others argued that this deduction had not been taken when other gymnasts had exceeded the required number and therefore ought not to apply in this case.  Hamm supporters also contended that Hamm had earned the right to be the last gymnast to compete based on his performance on the initial night of the competition and knowing what he needed to earn a gold, silver, or bronze medal, he had adjusted his high bar routine accordingly. If Yang Tae Young had been awarded an additional 0.100 point, Hamm would have been able to adjust his routine to take account of that fact, and might have earned a higher score on the high bar, the final piece of equipment.

Eventually, Bruno Grandi, President of the FIG, stated that the FIG would not change the results of the all-around.  However, the FIG sent a letter to Hamm in care of the United States Olympic Committee, stating:

If, (according to you [sic] declarations to the press), you would return your medal to the Korean if the FIG requested it, then such an action would be recognised as the ultimate demonstration of Fair-play by the whole world. The FIG and the IOC would highly appreciate the magnitude of this gesture.

In the letter, Grandi stated that Yang Tae Young was the "true winner" of the competition.

For the complete text, see this link.

The USOC was outraged by the FIG's request and refused to deliver the letter.  In a response letter to the FIG, the USOC stated:

The USOC views this letter as a blatant and inappropriate attempt on the part of FIG to once again shift responsibility for its own mistakes and instead pressure Mr. Hamm into resolving what has become an embarrassing situation for the Federation. The USOC finds this request to be improper, outrageous and so far beyond the bounds of what is acceptable that it refuses to transmit the letter to Mr. Hamm.

In the letter, the USOC also noted that the International Olympic Committee ("IOC") and its president, Jacques Rogge, opposed FIG's efforts to pressure Hamm in this manner, in direct contradiction to an implication made in the FIG's letter.

For the complete text of the USOC's response, see this link.

Yang then filed an official appeal with the Court of Arbitration for Sport (CAS), seeking to have his score changed and be awarded the gold medal.  On September 27, 2004, Hamm and the USOC appeared before the court in Lausanne, Switzerland during a hearing that lasted eleven and one-half hours.  Nearly one month later, on October 21, 2004, a three-judge CAS panel announced that the results from the Olympics would remain and that Paul Hamm would get to keep the gold medal.  The verdict was final and could not be appealed.  (See this link for the complete text of the decision.)

When asked whether or not he still deserved the gold medal by a news reporter, Hamm replied that he "shouldn't even be dealing with this." He later went on to say, "I do understand and feel the disappointment that Yang Tae Young has been subjected to, and I hope he understands what I have been through as well."

Effects of controversy
Immediately following the Olympics, General Mills announced which U.S. Olympians would appear on individual boxes of Wheaties cereal: swimmer Michael Phelps, gymnast Carly Patterson, and sprinter Justin Gatlin. Hamm was in talks to appear on a box, but the talks were dropped after the controversy.

Sullivan Award
Hamm was the James E. Sullivan Award winner for 2004 as the outstanding amateur athlete in the United States. He was the second gymnast to receive this honor after Kurt Thomas.

Comeback attempt for 2008 Olympics
Paul and Morgan Hamm  took some time off after the 2004 Olympics to focus on school at Ohio State University. They announced in February 2007 that they would return to competitive gymnastics, starting at the 2007 U.S. Championships, also known as the Visa Championships, after their title sponsor. In March 2008, Paul won the American Cup held in New York City. This was the first time he won this competition and performed with a strong showing.

On May 22, Paul competed on the first day of the 2008 U.S. Championships, but was forced to withdraw after day one after injuring his hand. During his routine on the parallel bars he fractured the fourth metacarpal of his right hand.  Orthopedic surgery five days later placed a titanium plate and nine screws in his hand and Paul was not cleared to return to gymnastics until July 3.  After sitting out the Olympic Trials, he was named to the 2008 Olympic Team on a provisional basis depending on his recovery. On July 19 he secured his spot on the 2008 team by participating in an intersquad meet and performed in all six events, only slightly modifying his routines to prevent aggravation of his injury.

On July 28, Paul announced his withdrawal from the United States Olympic gymnastics team due to persistent pain in his right hand and a new injury to his left shoulder from his accelerated recovery efforts. He was replaced on the team by Raj Bhavsar. He has indicated that he will permanently retire from the sport.

Comeback attempt for 2012 Olympics

Paul Hamm retired from gymnastics and ended his run to make the 2012 Olympic team.  Paul stated, "The years of training have taken a toll on my body and training at an Olympic level is no longer sustainable."

On December 15, 2015, it was announced that Hamm had been inducted into the 2016 class of the USA Gymnastics Hall of Fame.

Competitive history

2008 season

2007 season

2004 season

2003 season

2002 season

2001 season

2000 season

Sasuke
Hamm also competed on the popular Japanese television show, Sasuke (in America/UK: Ninja Warrior). He and his brother Morgan took part in three tournaments (#14, 15, and 16). Paul made it to the second stage of the 14th competition but missed completing it by inches (he cleared the last obstacle, the "Wall Lifting", but forgot to hit the red button before time ran out). In the 15th, he was unable to pass the First Stage obstacle, the "Warped Wall". In the 16th he made it to the second stage again but failed on the obstacle known as the "Metal Spin".

Arrest
On September 3, 2011, Hamm was accused of assaulting an Ohio taxi driver, damaging that taxi's window and refusing to pay his fare. He was arrested, and while in custody threatened the arresting officers. Hamm was charged with assault and two other misdemeanors. On September 9, Hamm was fired from his coaching position at Ohio State.

On Thursday, February 23, 2012,  Hamm pleaded no contest to a reduced set of two misdemeanor charges in an Upper Arlington court in suburban Columbus. A misdemeanor assault charge was dismissed.

A magistrate suspended a sentence of 90 days in custody on each count, provided that Hamm completes a year of probation, pay the cab fare, plus court fees, and must sit with a counselor for an alcohol assessment.

References

External links
 
 
 
 
 
 MakingTheOlympics.com, Official site of Paul and his brother
 "Hamm makes history", Associated Press article from SportsIllustrated.com
 "Paul Hamm", n°19 on Time's list of "100 Olympic Athletes To Watch"

1982 births
Living people
People from Washburn, Wisconsin
American male artistic gymnasts
Gymnasts at the 2000 Summer Olympics
Gymnasts at the 2004 Summer Olympics
James E. Sullivan Award recipients
Identical twins
Ohio State Buckeyes men's gymnasts
Olympic gold medalists for the United States in gymnastics
Olympic silver medalists for the United States in gymnastics
Medalists at the World Artistic Gymnastics Championships
Sportspeople from Waukesha, Wisconsin
Sasuke (TV series) contestants
American twins
Twin sportspeople
Sportspeople from the Milwaukee metropolitan area
Medalists at the 2004 Summer Olympics
People from Waukesha, Wisconsin